Rho guanine nucleotide exchange factor 4 is a protein that in humans is encoded by the ARHGEF4 gene.

Function 

Rho GTPases play a fundamental role in numerous cellular processes that are initiated by extracellular stimuli that work through G protein-coupled receptors. The encoded protein may form complex with G proteins and stimulate Rho-dependent signals. This protein is similar to rat collybistin protein. Alternative splicing of this gene generates two transcript variants that encode different isoforms. Also, there is possibility for the usage of multiple polyadenylation sites for this gene.

Model organisms 

Model organisms have been used in the study of ARHGEF4 function. A conditional knockout mouse line, called Arhgef4tm1a(KOMP)Wtsi was generated as part of the International Knockout Mouse Consortium program — a high-throughput mutagenesis project to generate and distribute animal models of disease to interested scientists.

Male and female animals underwent a standardized phenotypic screen to determine the effects of deletion. Twenty two tests were carried out on homozygous mutant mice and one significant abnormality was observed: males has atypical peripheral blood lymphocyte parameters, including a decreased B cell number and an increased granulocyte number.

Interactions 

ARHGEF4 has been shown to interact with APC.

References

External links

Further reading 

 
 
 
 
 

Genes mutated in mice